Tasmanian Steam Navigation Company Limited was an Australian steaming company, formed in Hobart in 1853 and defunct in 1922 after a series of acquisitions. It operated a shipping service from Tasmania to the Australian Mainland, later expanded to New Zealand.

History 
The company was formed in Hobart, Tasmania in 1853 to operate a shipping service from Tasmania to the Australian Mainland, and expanded its routes into New Zealand in 1864. It took over the Launceston & Melbourne Steam Navigation Co. in 1865 after the sinking of the S. S. City of Launceston.

From 1889 there was a three-way battle between the Union Steam Ship Company of New Zealand, Huddart Parker and the Tasmanian Steam Navigation Company (TSNCo) on the Tasmanian routes (Melbourne-Launceston, Hobart-Melbourne and Hobart-Sydney). The TSNCo did not have other routes to absorb their Tasmanian losses, and was bought out by the Union Company in 1891 but continued to trade under T.S.N.Co flag. E.M. Fisher regarded a Union Company takeover as the lesser of two evils.

In 1921 Huddart Parker and the Union Line formed a joint partnership company called Tasmanian Steamers to operate ferry services across the Bass Strait.
on 1 January 1922 all remaining vessels belonging to T.S.N.Co were transferred to Tasmanian Steamers.

Fleet
SS City of Hobart
SS Corinna
SS Derwent
SS Esk
SS Flinders
SS Flora
SS Havilah
SS Mangana
SS Oonah
SS Pateena
SS Southern Cross

SS Tamar
SS Tasman
SS Tasmania

References

Further reading

External links
Flotilla Australia: Tasmanian Steam Navigation Co.

Bass Strait ferries
Defunct shipping companies of Australia
Companies based in Tasmania
Ferry companies of Tasmania
Ferry companies of Victoria (Australia)
History of transport in Tasmania
1853 establishments in Australia
1922 disestablishments in Australia